Radovan is a Slavic male given name, derived from the passive adjective radovati ("rejoice"), itself from root rad- meaning "care, joy". It is found in Serbia, North Macedonia, Bosnia and Herzegovina, Croatia, Montenegro, Czech Republic, Slovakia, Russia, Ukraine, and Bulgaria. It is recorded in Serbia since the High Middle Ages. 

Male variations and diminutives (and nicknames) include Radovanče, Radan, Radánek, Rade, Rado, Radič, Radko, Radvan, Radúz, Radek, and cognates Radomir, Radomil and Radoslav. Female forms include Radka, Radana, Radomirka, Radmila, Radica.

Namedays include 13 January in Croatia, and 14 January in Slovakia and Czech Republic.

Notable people 
 Radovan (master), 13th-century Croatian sculptor and architect
 Radovan Jelašić, Serbian economist
 Radovan Jovićević, Serbian composer, producer and musician
 Radovan Karadžić, Bosnian Serb politician and convicted war criminal
 Radovan Krejčíř, Czech organized crime boss and convicted criminal
 Radovan Lukavský, Czech actor and theatrical pedagogue
 Radovan Sloboda (ice hockey), Slovak ice hockey player
 Radovan Sloboda (politician), Slovak politician and sports administrator
 Radovan Vujović, Serbian actor
 Radovan Zogović, Montenegrin poet

Fictional characters 
 Prince Radovan, character in the Czech fairy-tale Princezna se zlatou hvězdou

See also 
 all pages named Radovan
 Radovanović

References

Sources

External links
 Forvo.com pronunciation of the name Radovan

Slavic masculine given names
Serbian masculine given names
Croatian masculine given names
Czech masculine given names
Montenegrin masculine given names
Slovak masculine given names
Bulgarian masculine given names